William Letriz (born 20 May 1958) is a Puerto Rican weightlifter. He competed at the 1984 Summer Olympics and the 1988 Summer Olympics.

References

1958 births
Living people
Puerto Rican male weightlifters
Olympic weightlifters of Puerto Rico
Weightlifters at the 1984 Summer Olympics
Weightlifters at the 1988 Summer Olympics
Place of birth missing (living people)
Pan American Games medalists in weightlifting
Pan American Games silver medalists for Puerto Rico
Central American and Caribbean Games medalists in weightlifting
Weightlifters at the 1987 Pan American Games
20th-century Puerto Rican people
21st-century Puerto Rican people